Tô de Bem com a Vida is the seventeenth studio album and the twelfth in Portuguese by Brazilian pop singer Xuxa Meneghel. It was released by Som Livre on October 5, 1996.

Like Sexto Sentido (1994) and Luz no Meu Caminho (1995), Tô de Bem com a Vida was designed with the aim of appealing to both children and teenagers, as the Xuxa audience continued to follow their work. The album has as its main bet the Axé. The rhythms and culture of Brazil are very present in the album in tracks like "Quadrilha Da Xuxa", representing the June Festival and "Vaqueiro Vai Buscar Meu Boi", which portrays folklore.

Tô de Bem com a Vida was the first album by a Brazilian artist to be released simultaneously on TV, radio and internet. The album was certified platinum by Associação Brasileira de Produtores de Discos (ABPD).

Production and songs
In a climate of celebration due to the 10 years of Rede Globo, Xuxa wanted a happy album that reflected his current state of mind and this was the main inspiration of the album that counts on only two slow songs.

The highlight of the album is the mix of Brazilian rhythms and themes. Axé came as the biggest bet with songs like Tô de well with Life and Xuxaxé, in addition to Carnaxuxa that portrays how is the carnival in the different corners of Brazil.

Still in the Culture of Brazil issue, was composed "A Caravela De Cabral", who talks about the history of the discovery of Brazil and "Vaqueiro Vai Buscar Meu Boi", which brings a bit of folklore to the album.

"Ai, Ai, Ai" was originally composed for the singer Falcão. When Zé Henrique (songwriter) showed the song to the manager of Xuxa at the time, Marlene Mattos, she decided that the presenter would record the song for the album, arguing that the singer was irreverent and would marry the proposal of the album.

The track "Brincar De Rimar" is a re-recording of Fofão, but with the letter altered. In the passage that quotes the character, his name is replaced by that of Xuxa.

The song "Amiga", composition in homage to Marlene Mattos, was recorded without the manager knew. The music video was also recorded as a surprise to the manager. The album was entirely produced by Michael Sullivan.

Release and reception
Tô de Bem com a Vida It was released by Som Livre on October 5, 1996 in CD, cassette and LP being the last released in this format. Tô de Bem com a Vida, was certified platinum by Associação Brasileira de Produtores de Discos (ABPD), for 250,000 copies sold reached.

Promotion
Tô de Bem com a Vida was well publicized in Xuxa Park, as well as the homonymous music that was sung several times in the program and in the frame Xuxa Hits. In addition to singing some of the songs in his attraction, Xuxa participated twice in Domingão do Faustão, the first on September 29 and the second on October 6 where he was honored in the framework of the program Confidential Archive.

Some of the songs won music videos on the specials of Children's Day and Christmas of 1996, these were: "Tô De Bem Com A Vida", "Xuxaxé", 	"Lá Vai A Loura", "Brincar De Rimar", "Ai, Ai, Ai" and "A Chuva". The "Amiga" video was only shown in 1998 in one of the editions of Xuxa 12 years.

In November 1996, Xuxa began the tour of the album by Brazil that extends until December 1997. The show that happened through several cities, was attended by more than 500 thousand people.

Track listing

Personnel
Produced: Michael Sullivan
Art Direction: Aramis Barros
Recording Technician: Mario Jorge and Sergio Rocha
Mixing: Som Livre
Technical Mixer: Sergio 'Gordo' Guimarães
Recorded in the studios: Som Livre
Production Assistant: Duda Nogueira
Studio Coordination: Helio de Freitas
Mastering: Som Livre - Sergio Seabra
Recording Assistants: Everaldo, Claudio Oliveira, Julio Carneiro, Ivan Carvalho and Mauro

Certifications

References

External links 
 Tô de Bem com a Vida at Discogs

1996 albums
Xuxa albums
Som Livre albums
Portuguese-language albums